Xantho is a genus of crabs in the family Xanthidae, containing five extant species, all restricted to the north-east Atlantic Ocean and Mediterranean Sea, although Xantho granulicarpis is not universally recognised as a separate species from Xantho hydrophilus:

Xantho granulicarpus Forest, 1953
Xantho hydrophilus (Herbst, 1790)
Xantho pilipes A. Milne-Edwards, 1867
Xantho poressa (Olivi, 1792)
Xantho sexdentatus (Miers, 1881)

Five species are known from the fossil record, including one species that is still extant.

References

Xanthoidea
Crustaceans of the Atlantic Ocean
Miocene crustaceans
Pliocene crustaceans
Pleistocene crustaceans